Peoria Mineral Springs is 14,500-year-old natural spring in the city of Peoria, Illinois, United States. The site, also known as Spring Hill, is located on a hillside on the historic West Bluff. In 1843, a "cave-like barrel-vaulted brick reservoir" was constructed; the structure is concealed within the hillside and captures the flow of three separate springs. The brick reservoir was built for Peoria's first water company, prior to that the site was a Native American campground. Artifacts can still be found around the site. The site was added to the U.S. National Register of Historic Places on March 5, 1982.

Notes

External links

Industrial buildings completed in 1843
Mineral Springs, Peoria
National Register of Historic Places in Peoria County, Illinois
Springs of Illinois
Archaeological sites on the National Register of Historic Places in Illinois
Industrial buildings and structures on the National Register of Historic Places in Illinois
Bodies of water of Peoria County, Illinois
1843 establishments in Illinois